EUROMICRO is a non-profit organization.

History
It was founded in 1973 by Rodnay Zaks and co-founded by Reiner Hartenstein and a few other colleagues in response to emerging microprocessor technology (workstations, PCs etc. that were to be networked soon). EUROMICRO has focused on promoting, discussing, disseminating knowledge, information and skills, in education, academia, government and industry.

Euromicro focuses upon multimedia, telecommunication, software engineeringreal-time systems, parallel and distributed processing, computer architecture, robotics and hardware design.

It publishes the Journal of Systems Architecture (JSA), through North Holland (Elsevier). Conference and workshop proceedings are published through IEEE Computer Press.

External links
Official website
Conference information

Information technology organizations based in Europe